Countess Juliane of Nassau-Siegen (3 September 1587 – 15 February 1643), official titles: Gräfin zu Nassau, Katzenelnbogen, Vianden und Diez, Frau zu Beilstein, was a countess from the House of Nassau-Siegen, a cadet branch of the Ottonian Line of the House of Nassau, and through marriage landgravine of Hesse-Kassel.

Biography
Juliane was born at Dillenburg Castle on 3 September 1587 as the fifth child and second daughter of Count John VII the Middle of Nassau-Siegen and his first wife, Countess Magdalene of Waldeck-Wildungen.

Juliane was brought up in the strict Calvinist tradition, but was also taught old and new languages. In addition to her siblings, the stepbrothers and -sisters from her mother’s first marriage also lived in the child-rich household at Dillenburg Castle. The marriage of her eldest stepbrother, Count Philip Louis II of Hanau-Münzenberg, to Countess Catherine Belgica of Nassau, a daughter of Prince William I the Silent of Orange, was also celebrated here in 1596, a festive highlight of Juliana’s childhood.

In February 1603, only three months after the death of his first wife Agnes of Solms-Laubach, Landgrave Maurice of Hesse-Kassel made a marriage proposal to the fifteen-year-old Juliane. The marriage took place three months later at Dillenburg Castle.

Through his marriage to Juliane, Maurice’s religious policy was influenced as he forged the closest of alliances with the House of Nassau-Siegen, which practised an outspoken Calvinist policy in the Holy Roman Empire. In domestic politics, Juliane strengthened the weight of the Calvinist party in Kassel, thus sharpening Maurice’s aversion to the nobility, which was already dissatisfied with his policies. Soon after his marriage, the Landgrave of Hesse-Kassel was considered in imperial politics as a protagonist of the Calvinist cause, alongside the Electoral Palatinate, who also belonged to the relatives of the House of Nassau.

Despite her Calvinist upbringing, Juliane led a fairly representative court life with Maurice, but she always valued her financial independence and kept careful track of her expenses. As Maurice had three sons from his first marriage, Juliane soon sought to pass on income and property rights to her children.

In the autumn of 1623, troops of the Catholic League under Tilly were quartered in Hesse-Kassel. Maurice’s diplomatic trips to the Protestant courts in Northern Germany were, despite the hectic schedule, clearly escapist. Not only the Hessian estates of the realm, but also Juliane publicly accused him of having led the country to ruin and then abandoned it. When the estates independently entered into negotiations with Tilly to obtain the withdrawal of the troops of the Catholic League or at least a reduction in the war burden, Maurice accused them of treason. The breach that thus occurred was definitive. The estates, the councillors and Juliane in particular urged Maurice to resign from government. On 17 March 1627, he was forced to resign in favour of his son William V. Prior to this, Juliane had managed to secure a quarter of Hesse-Kassel – the so-called Rotenburger Quart – for her and her children in the House Treaty of 12 February 1627, in order to secure their income. From this quarter, after her sons Herman and Frederick died without heirs, emerged the cadet branch Hesse-Rheinfels-Rotenburg, founded by Landgrave Ernest.

In the family conflict with Maurice, who fought with her over money, household goods and the education of the children, Juliane first defended her own interests and then those of her children, but without coming to a confrontation with her stepson, the ruling Landgrave William V. But she was also very active in the conflict within her own Nassau-Siegen family. She stood up for the Calvinists in the county of Nassau-Siegen who suffered from the recatholicisation attempts of her brother John VIII, who had converted to the Catholic Church and was in Spanish service.

Juliane was able to put her interest in state administration into practice after she had gained the relevant knowledge in the Rotenburger Quart, which she initially managed together with her eldest son Herman. Faced with the threat of war, Juliane again sought brief shelter at Kassel Castle in 1631 and then lived until her death in the Nassauer Hof at the River Fulda, later called Packhof vor der Schlagd, which Maurice had already given her in 1617.

Juliane was self-confident even in foreign policy; she attended the Electors’ Day in Mulhouse in 1627 and contributed to the rapprochement between the branches Hesse-Kassel and Hesse-Darmstadt in the so-called ‘Main Agreement’. Of far-reaching significance was the contact with Sweden that she initiated in 1630 through the mediation of her relatives from the House of Orange-Nassau, which led to the Swedish-Hessian Covenant of Werben in the following year, firmly binding the Landgrave of Hesse-Kassel to Sweden.

Juliane died in Eschwege on 15 February 1643. She was buried in Kassel on 23 March 1643. Adolphus Fabritius wrote a Leichenpredigt for her, which was published in Kassel in 1643.

Marriage and children

Juliane married Landgrave Maurice of Hesse-Kassel (Kassel, 25 May 1572 - Eschwege, 15 March 1632). The Beilager took place at Dillenburg Castle on 21 May 1603Jul. and the Heimführung in Kassel on 4 June 1603Jul.. From this marriage, the following children were born:
 Philip (Kassel, 26 November 1604 – killed at the Battle of Lutter, 17 August 1626), was an officer in the Danish Army.
 Agnes (Kassel, 13/14 May 1606 – Dessau, 28 May 1650), married in Dessau on 18 May 1623 to Fürst John Casimir of Anhalt-Dessau (Dessau, 7 December 1596 – Dessau, 15 September 1660).
 Herman (Kassel, 15 August 1607 – Rotenburg an der Fulda, 25 March 1658), Landgrave of Hesse-Rotenburg. Married:
 in Waldeck on 31 December 1633 to his first cousin Countess Sofia Juliana of Waldeck-Wildungen (Wildungen, 1 April 1607 – Ziegenhain, 15 September 1637).
 in Weimar on 2 January 1642 to Princess Cunegonda Juliane of Anhalt-Dessau (Dessau, 17 February 1608 – Rotenburg an der Fulda, 26 September 1683).
 Juliane (Marburg, 7 October 1608 – Kassel, 11 December 1628).
 Sabine (Kassel, 5 July 1610 – Kassel, 21 May 1620).
  (Kassel, 25 August 1611 – Bedburg, 12 February 1671), married in Rotenburg an der Fulda on 27 April 1646 to Count Erik Adolf of Salm-Reifferscheid (1 February 1619 – 18 April 1678).
 Maurice (Kassel, 13 June 1614 – Kassel, 16 February 1633), was Rittmeister in the Swedish Army.
 Sophie (Kassel, 12 September 1615 – Bückeburg, 22 November 1670), married in Stadthagen on 12 October 1644 to Count Philip I of Schaumburg-Lippe ( near Lemgo, 18 July 1601 – 10 April 1681).
 Frederick (Kassel, 9 May 1617 – killed in battle, Kosten, 24 September 1655), Landgrave of Hesse-Eschwege. Married in Stockholm on 6 September 1646 to Countess Palatine Eleonore Catherine of Zweibrücken-Kleeburg (Stegeborg Castle, 17 May 1626 - Osterholz near Bremen, 3 March 1692).
 Christian (Kassel, 5 February 1622 – Bückeburg, 14 November 1640), was commander of a company in the Swedish Army. He died after an altercation with General Johan Banér and some other officers; he was probably poisoned.
 Ernest (Kassel, 17 December 1623 – Cologne, 12 May 1693), Landgrave of Hesse-Rheinfels. Married:
 in Frankfurt on 10 June 1647 to Countess Mary Eleonore of Solms-Hohensolms (16 December 1632 – Cologne, 12 August 1689).
 (morganatically) in Rheinfels Castle on 3 February 1690 to Alexandrina Ernestina Maria Juliana von Dürnizl (Straubing, c. 1673 – Cologne, 22 December 1754).
 Christine (Kassel, 9 July 1625 – Kassel, 25 July 1626).
 Philip (Kassel, 28 September 1626 – Rotenburg an der Fulda, 8 July 1629).
 Elisabeth (Kassel, 23 October 1628 – Kassel, 10 February 1633).

Known descendants
Juliane has many known descendants. All reigning European monarchs, with the exception of the Fürst of Liechtenstein, are descendants of her. Other known descendants are:
 the head of the no longer reigning royal house of Baden,
 the head of the no longer reigning royal house of Greece,
 the Prussian Field Marshal Fürst Leopold I of Anhalt-Dessau (der Alte Dessauer), 
 the French Field Marshal Maurice of Saxony, 
 the German chancellor Max von Baden, and 
 the German fighter pilot from World War I Manfred von Richthofen (The Red Baron).

Ancestors

Literature
 : Juliane Landgräfin zu Hessen (1587–1643), published as: Quellen und Forschungen zur hessischen Geschichte, vol. 90, Darmstadt, Marburg, 1994.

Notes

References

Sources
 
 
 
 
 
 
 
 
 
 
 
 
 
  (1979). "Genealogische gegevens". In:  (red.), Nassau en Oranje in de Nederlandse geschiedenis (in Dutch). Alphen aan den Rijn: A.W. Sijthoff. p. 40–44, 224–228. .
 
  (1882). Het vorstenhuis Oranje-Nassau. Van de vroegste tijden tot heden (in Dutch). Leiden: A.W. Sijthoff/Utrecht: J.L. Beijers.

External links 

 Brabant & Hesse Part 3. In: An Online Gotha, by Paul Theroff.
 Hessen. In: Medieval Lands. A prosopography of medieval European noble and royal families, compiled by Charles Cawley.
 Hessen-Kassel, Juliane Landgräfin von (in German). In: Landesgeschichtliches Informationssystem Hessen (LAGIS) (in German).
 Nassau. In: Medieval Lands. A prosopography of medieval European noble and royal families, compiled by Charles Cawley.
 Nassau Part 5. In: An Online Gotha, by Paul Theroff.

|-

1587 births
1643 deaths
Juliane of Nassau-Siegen
German Calvinist and Reformed Christians
Juliane of Nassau-Siegen
Juliane of Nassau-Siegen
People from Dillenburg
16th-century German women
17th-century German women